Sabri Lamouchi (born 9 November 1971) is a French football manager and former professional football midfielder. He is currently the manager of English Football League Championship club Cardiff City F.C.

Early life
Lamouchi was born in Lyon, France, and is of Tunisian descent.

Club career
Lamouchi started his professional career with Alès and then moved to Auxerre for four years. He then went on to join Monaco, who he helped to the Ligue 1 title in 2000, before being snapped up by Parma of Italy. He later moved to Inter Milan.

Lamouchi had a spell at Genoa before joining Marseille on loan the following year. In January 2006, the loan deal was made a permanent move. He played for Marseille for six further months, until he announced that he was leaving the club on 18 September 2006, although his contract ran until June 2007.

In 2006, Lamouchi moved to Al-Rayyan in the Qatar Stars League, where he scored a spectacular goal in his first match. The next season, he joined Umm-Salal.

In January 2009, Lamouchi transferred to Al-Kharitiyath.

International career
Lamouchi was capped 12 times and scored one goal for the French national team. He made his debut in 1996 and was a member of the French European Championship squad the same year. He was in France's 28 men-preliminary squad for the 1998 FIFA World Cup on home soil. However he was one of the six players axed by head coach Aimé Jacquet just before the tournament began. The team went on to win the tournament.

Managerial career

Ivory Coast
In May 2012, he became manager of the Ivory Coast national team, his first managerial position. The Elephants qualified for the 2014 FIFA World Cup, ranked 23rd at the time – highest ranked in Africa – and started their group play with a 2–1 victory over Japan. That was followed by a 2–1 loss to group favourite Colombia. On his last game as Ivory Coast's manager, he and his team lost 2–1 against Greece and they were eliminated from the FIFA World Cup. The team featured stars such as Yaya Touré, Gervinho, Wilfried Bony and Didier Drogba. Lamouchi resigned from the position following Les Elephants' exit from the competition.

Rennes
On 8 November 2017, Lamouchi became the manager of French side Rennes. He led the team to a 5th place synonymous with Europa League qualification. On 3 December 2018 after a string of poor results, he was sacked from the club.

Nottingham Forest

2019–20 season
On 28 June 2019, following the departure of Martin O'Neill, it was announced that Lamouchi would become head coach of Nottingham Forest for the 2019–20 season. He enjoyed a strong start to the season and won the league's Manager of the Month award for September 2019. On 19 June 2020, Nottingham Forest announced that Lamouchi had signed an extension to his managerial contract. Forest were in the play-off positions for nearly the whole season, but missed out by finishing seventh on the final day of the season after being beaten at home 1–4 by Stoke City. Lamouchi had guided Forest to their highest league position since the 2010–11 season, and also became the first Forest manager to complete a full season in over nine years.

2020–21 season
Following Forest's disappointing end to the season, Lamouchi flew to Athens to meet with the Forest board, including Forest owner Evangelos Marinakis, where it was decided that Lamouchi would remain as Forest's Head Coach. To improve on the shortcomings of the previous season, four new additions were made to Lamouchi's coaching staff, along with a change in transfer strategy that would place a greater focus on domestic signings.

On 5 September 2020, Nottingham Forest were knocked out of the League Cup in a 1–0 defeat to Barnsley. In a video call to the squad following that game, Marinakis described the result as a 'humiliation' to the football club that Forest would lose twice to a club that had barely survived relegation the previous season. It was clear that Marinakis' patience with Lamouchi was running out, and Marinakis angrily told Albert Adomah and João Carvalho that they could leave the club without consulting Lamouchi.

On 6 October 2020, Lamouchi's contract was terminated and he was immediately replaced by Chris Hughton. Forest had lost all five competitive games of the new season, and had failed to win in their last eleven games.

Al-Duhail
In October 2020, Lamouchi was appointed manager of Qatari side Al-Duhail. On 9 August 2021, his contract was terminated by mutual consent.

Cardiff City
On 27 January 2023, Lamouchi returned to British football when he was appointed as manager of Welsh club Cardiff City.

Managerial statistics

Honours

Player
Auxerre
Division 1: 1995–96
Coupe de France: 1995–96

Monaco
Division 1: 1999–2000

Parma
Coppa Italia: 2001–02

Marseille
UEFA Intertoto Cup: 2005

Manager
El Jaish
Qatar Crown Prince Cup: 2016

Individual
EFL Championship Manager of the Month: September 2019, January 2020

References

External links

 (archived)
 

1971 births
Living people
Footballers from Lyon
French footballers
Association football midfielders
Olympique Alès players
AJ Auxerre players
AS Monaco FC players
Parma Calcio 1913 players
Inter Milan players
Genoa C.F.C. players
Olympique de Marseille players
Al-Rayyan SC players
Umm Salal SC players
Al Kharaitiyat SC players
Ligue 1 players
Ligue 2 players
Serie A players
Serie B players
Qatar Stars League players
France international footballers
UEFA Euro 1996 players
French expatriate footballers
Expatriate footballers in Italy
Expatriate footballers in Qatar
French football managers
Ivory Coast national football team managers
El Jaish SC managers
Stade Rennais F.C. managers
Nottingham Forest F.C. managers
Al-Duhail SC managers
Cardiff City F.C. managers
2014 FIFA World Cup managers
2013 Africa Cup of Nations managers
Ligue 1 managers
English Football League managers
French expatriate football managers
Expatriate football managers in England
Expatriate football managers in Ivory Coast
Expatriate football managers in Qatar
French expatriate sportspeople in England
French expatriate sportspeople in Italy
French expatriate sportspeople in Ivory Coast
French expatriate sportspeople in Qatar
French sportspeople of Tunisian descent